Entopolypoides is a genus of parasites belonging to the phylum Apicomplexa.

History
The type species (Entopolypoides macaci) was described by Mayer in 1934 in a Macaca irus monkey from Java.

Description
Young parasites are delicate rings with a large vacuole but the more mature parasites have several fine long processes.

After three days in the erythrocyte the parasite divides into four. There is no synchronicity of division.

Host range
 vervet monkeys (Cercopithecus aethiops pygerythrus)
 Syke's monkeys (Cercopithecus mitis)
 long tailed macaques (Macaca fascicularis)
 macaque (Macaca irus)
 yellow baboon (Papio cynocephalus)

Note

The genus Entopolypoides may be synonymous with that of Babesia. Further work in this area will be need to clarify this.

References

Piroplasmida
Apicomplexa genera
Parasites of primates